The 1897–98 FA Cup was the 27th season of the world's oldest association football competition, the Football Association Challenge Cup (more usually known as the FA Cup). The cup was won by Nottingham Forest, who defeated Derby County 3–1 in the final of the competition, played at Crystal Palace in London.

Matches were scheduled to be played at the stadium of the team named first on the date specified for each round, which was always a Saturday. If scores were level after 90 minutes had been played, a replay would take place at the stadium of the second-named team later the same week. If the replayed match was drawn further replays would be held at neutral venues until a winner was determined. If scores were level after 90 minutes had been played in a replay, a 30-minute period of extra time would be played.

Calendar
The format of the FA Cup for the season had a preliminary round, five qualifying rounds, three proper rounds, and the semi finals and final.

First round proper
The first round proper contained sixteen ties between 32 teams. The 16 First Division sides were given a bye to this round, as were Newton Heath, Burnley, Leicester Fosse, Grimsby Town, Walsall and Manchester City from the Second Division. The other Second Division sides were entered into the third qualifying round. Of those sides, only Newcastle United, Woolwich Arsenal, Luton Town and Gainsborough Trinity qualified to the FA Cup proper. Six non-league sides also qualified.

The matches were played on Saturday, 29 January 1898. One match was drawn, with the replay taking place in the following midweek fixture.

Second round proper
The eight Second Round matches were scheduled for Saturday, 12 February 1898. There were two replays, played in the following midweek fixture.

Third round proper
The four Third Round matches were scheduled for Saturday, 26 February 1898. There were two replays, played in the following midweek fixture.

Semi-finals

The semi-final matches were both played on Saturday, 19 March 1898. The Nottingham Forest–Southampton match went to a replay, played the following Wednesday, when Nottingham Forest managed a 2–0 win. They went on to meet Derby County in the final at Crystal Palace.

Replay

Final

The final took place on Saturday, 16 April 1898 at Crystal Palace.  Just over 62,000 supporters attended the match. Arthur Capes opened the scoring for Nottingham Forest after 19 minutes. Forest's lead was maintained for only twelve minutes before Derby County equalised, through a goal from Steve Bloomer. Capes hit his second just before half-time, and Forest preserved the lead until the 86th minute, when McPherson scored a third Forest goal, to hand them their first ever FA Cup Victory.

Match details

See also
FA Cup Final Results 1872-

References
General
Official site; fixtures and results service at TheFA.com
1897-1898 FA Cup at rsssf.com
1897-1898 FA Cup at soccerbase.com

Specific

1897-98
1897–98 in English football
FA